Rudolf Bax (born 24 November 1878) was an English-Swiss footballer who played as striker or midfielder during the 1890s.

Football career
Bax first played football with the Buckjumpers Club Basel, a team made up from high school students and upper secondary school pupils, founded in 1894. As the club disbanded in 1896, some of their members joined FC Basel during their 1895–96 season and Bax was one of them.

Bax played his game for his new club in the home game on 8 November 1896 as Basel were defeated 1–2 by Grasshopper Club.

Bax stayed with the Basel team for the entire season and played in six of the club's seven games during that period. Because the game sheets for this season no longer exist or are incomplete, although all the player line ups are clear, all goal scorers in this season remain unknown.

Notes

Footnotes

References

Sources
 Rotblau: Jahrbuch Saison 2017/2018. Publisher: FC Basel Marketing AG. 
 Die ersten 125 Jahre. Publisher: Josef Zindel im Friedrich Reinhardt Verlag, Basel. 
 Verein "Basler Fussballarchiv" Homepage
(NB: Despite all efforts, the editors of these books and the authors in "Basler Fussballarchiv" have failed to be able to identify all the players, their date and place of birth or date and place of death, who played in the games during the early years of FC Basel)

FC Basel players
Swiss men's footballers
English footballers
Association football midfielders
Association football forwards
1878 births
Date of death missing